William Bourke, 8th Baron Bourke of Connell (died c.1691) was an Irish Jacobite peer.

Bourke was the son of Thomas Bourke, 7th Baron Bourke of Connell and Margaret Hore. He inherited his father's peerage in 1680. He was appointed Lord Lieutenant of Limerick and Lord Lieutenant of the City of Limerick by James II of England. During the Williamite War in Ireland, he was summoned to the Irish House of Lords in the brief Patriot Parliament called by James in 1689 and received a commission as a captain in the Earl of Tyrone's regiment of foot. He later became a lieutenant colonel in Sutherland's regiment of horse and fought at the Battle of Aughrim in 1691.

Following the Jacobite defeat, Bourke followed James into exile in France and was attainted of his title and estates by the English government. He died in France in obscurity.

References

Year of birth unknown
Year of death uncertain
Barons in the Peerage of Ireland
Irish Jacobites
Irish soldiers in the army of James II of England
Lord-Lieutenants of Limerick
Members of the Irish House of Lords
People convicted under a bill of attainder